Louis Baird "Pat" Duncan (October 6, 1893 – July 17, 1960) was an American professional baseball outfielder. He played in Major League Baseball (MLB) from 1915 through 1924 for the Pittsburgh Pirates and Cincinnati Reds.

In 1921, the park (Crosley Field) was in its tenth season and no one had yet hit a ball over the fence without the benefit of a bounce. The first ball to clear the fence on the fly was hit in late May by John Beckwith of the Chicago Giants of the Negro National League. Then on June 2, with the last-place Reds playing the St. Louis Cardinals, Duncan dug in against left-handed hurler Ferdie Schupp with a runner on second and one out. Duncan connected. The ball rocketed toward left field, easily cleared the wall, and Duncan had registered Organized Baseball’s first home run to go out of the park in Redland Field. It cleared the 12-foot concrete wall by four to six feet, and it traveled an estimated 400 feet.

In 727 games played, Duncan batted .307 (827-2695) with 23 home runs, 361 runs, and 374 RBI. His best year was 1922 when he hit .328 with 8 home runs and 94 RBI. In the 1919 World Series he hit .269 (7-26) and leading all regulars with 8 RBI.

External links

1893 births
1960 deaths
Pittsburgh Pirates players
Cincinnati Reds players
Major League Baseball outfielders
Baseball players from Ohio
Battle Creek Crickets players
Grand Rapids Black Sox players
Birmingham Barons players
Minneapolis Millers (baseball) players
Rochester Red Wings players
Chattanooga Lookouts players
People from Jackson County, Ohio
Ironton Diggers players